Helge Hagerman (19 May 1910 – 25 November 1995) was a Swedish actor and film producer. He appeared in more than 40 films between 1933 and 1989.

Selected filmography
 His Life's Match (1932)
 Raggen (1936)
 The Quartet That Split Up (1936)
 Johan Ulfstjerna (1936)
 Sun Over Sweden (1938)
 Wanted (1939)
 The Talk of the Town (1941)
 The Old Clock at Ronneberga (1944)
 Thirst (1949)
 This Can't Happen Here (1950)
 The Quartet That Split Up (1950)
 Beef and the Banana (1951)
 Dance, My Doll (1953)
 Wild Birds (1955)
 Violence (1955)
 Darling of Mine (1955)
 The Light from Lund (1955)
 The Unicorn (1955)
 The Stranger from the Sky (1956)
 Encounters in the Twilight (1957)
 Seventeen Years Old (1957)
 Night Light (1957)
 A Dreamer's Journey (1957)
 A Goat in the Garden (1958)
 Laila (1958)
 Crime in Paradise (1959)
 Agaton Sax and the Byköpings Village Festival (1976)

References

External links

1910 births
1995 deaths
Swedish male film actors
Swedish film producers
Male actors from Stockholm
20th-century Swedish male actors